Joseph M. Chamberlain (July 26, 1923 – November 28, 2011) was the chairman of Adler Planetarium.

Biography
Joseph M. Chamberlain was born on July 26, 1923, in Peoria, Illinois. He was hired as an assistant curator to the Rose Center for Earth and Space in 1952. In 1956, he became the chairman of the planetarium. The Adler Planetarium announced on December 11, 2011, that he died on November 28, of that year, at age 88 in Peoria, Illinois.

References

Further reading
 
 
 

1923 births
People from Peoria, Illinois
2011 deaths